Torbernite is a radioactive, hydrated green copper uranyl phosphate mineral, found in granites and other uranium-bearing deposits as a secondary mineral. Its name derives from the Swedish chemist Torbern Bergman (1735–1784), It is also known as chalcolite. Torbernite is isostructural with the related uranium mineral, autunite. 

The chemical formula of torbernite is similar to that of autunite in which a Cu2+ cation replaces a Ca2+. The number of water hydration molecules can vary between 12 and 8, giving rise to the variety of metatorbernite when torbernite spontaneously dehydrates. Their respective chemical compositions are the following:

Torbernite
Cu(UO2)2(PO4)2

Metatorbernite
Cu(UO2)2(PO4)2

Torbernite's most common alternative names are copper uranite and cupro-uranite.

Uses

As a radioactive mineral, torbernite has some limited significance as a uranium ore. Its vibrant green color and well-developed distinctive crystals (size: mm to a few cm) make it a sought-after collector's mineral, as well. However, torbernite, like other hydrated minerals, can easily suffer from loss of water molecules. This loss of water from the mineral leads to an alteration of torbernite specimens into its pseudomorph, meta-torbernite. Some collector's websites assert that any torbernite specimen more than a few years old should be considered fully transitioned to meta-torbernite. However, it likely depends on the temperature and relative humidity of ambient air in which specimens are stored. 

As torbernite is radioactive and outgases radon (222Rn), collectors are urged to take proper precautions in the handling and storage of any specimens. An adequate ventilation of the rooms and the cabinets in which the specimens are stored is essential to evacuate the radioactive radon gas responsible for lung cancer, but it could increase the dehydration rate of the specimens. To limit radon inhalation, naked specimens should never be stored in rooms in which one spends much living or working time. An alternative is to store specimens in gas tight transparent containers in which radon will accumulate and decay to secular equilibrium.

Associated minerals
Torbernite frequently occurs in conjunction with other uranium minerals, as well as host rock minerals. These associated minerals include:
 autunite, 
 uraninite, 
 uranophane, 
 uranocircite, 
 topaz,

Identification
The most obvious factor in identifying torbernite is its radioactivity. However, since it is frequently found in association with other radioactive minerals, this may not be useful in separating one uranium mineral from the rest. A next step would be to check color. Most uranium-bearing minerals are bright yellow or green. As torbernite is exclusively green, this can be a useful secondary fact. Crystal habit is also useful, but as it shares a similar structure and color with autunite. Nonetheless, regardless of identification, it is likely that at least some of the specimen will have already altered to meta-torbernite.

See also
 List of minerals
 List of minerals named after people
 Metatorbernite

References

External links
 

 Mineral Galleries
Copper(II) minerals
Uranium(VI) minerals
Phosphate minerals
Hydrates
Radioactive minerals
Tetragonal minerals
Minerals in space group 139